The 1968 Northwestern Wildcats team represented Northwestern University during the 1968 Big Ten Conference football season. In their fifth year under head coach Alex Agase, the Wildcats compiled a 1–9 record (1–6 against Big Ten Conference opponents) and finished in a tie for eighth place in the Big Ten Conference.

The team's offensive leaders were quarterback Dave Shelbourne with 1,358 passing yards, Bob Olson with 342 rushing yards, and Bruce Hubbard with 551 receiving yards.

Schedule

Roster

References

Northwestern
Northwestern Wildcats football seasons
Northwestern Wildcats football